Theodor Otto Richard Plievier (Plivier, until 1933) (12 February 1892, Berlin – 12 March 1955, Avegno, Switzerland) was a German writer best known for his 1948 anti-war novel .

During World War I, he served on the SMS Wolf. After the war, he released his first novel, Des Kaisers Kulis (The Kaiser's Coolies), about his experiences onboard the ship. It would later be adapted into a stageplay, and was banned after the Nazi Machtergreifung.

His experiences in war form the basis of his documentary novel .

A television version of Stalingrad was produced by NDR in West Germany, and first shown on 31 January 1963. Adapted by Klaus Hubalek and directed by Gustav Burmester, it starred Ullrich Haupt as Generalmajor Vilshofen, Wolfgang Büttner as General Gönnern, Hanns Lothar as Gnotke, and P. Walter Jacob  as General Vennekohl. Hubalek's screenplay was subsequently translated into English and directed by Rudolph Cartier for the BBC's Festival series, first shown on 4 December 1963. This version  starred Albert Lieven as Vilshofen, Peter Vaughan as Gonnern, André van Gyseghem as Vennekohl, and Harry Fowler as Gnotke.

Works in English
 Berlin, translated by Louis Hagen, London, Panther (1969)  
 The Kaiser Goes: The Generals Remain, translated by A.W. Wheen, London, Faber and Faber, Limited (1933) 
 The Kaiser’s Coolies, translated by Margaret Green, H. Fertig, (1988, reprint c1931)  
 Moscow, translated by Stuart Hood, London, F. Muller (1953)
 The World's Last Corner, adapted from a translation by Robert Pick, New York, Appleton-Century-Crofts (1951)   
 Revolt on the Pampas, translated by Charles Ashleigh, M. Joseph, Ltd. (1937)
 Stalingrad, translated by Richard and Clara Winston, New York, Appleton-Century-Crofts (1948)

See also 
 Gerhard Fauth

References

External links
 
 

1892 births
1955 deaths
Refugees from Nazi Germany in the Soviet Union
German male novelists
20th-century German novelists
20th-century German male writers
Works about the Battle of Stalingrad
Imperial German Navy personnel of World War I
Mutineers